Roshan Lal Nagrath (14 July 1917 – 16 November 1967), better known by his first name Roshan, was an Indian esraj player and music director. He was the father of the actor and film director Rakesh Roshan and music director Rajesh Roshan and paternal grandfather of Hrithik Roshan.

Early life and education
Roshan was born on 14 July 1917 in Gujranwala, Punjab Province (now Punjab, Pakistan),  British India. He began music lessons at a young age and later attended Marris College in Lucknow, United Provinces of Agra and Oudh under the training of Pandit S N Ratanjankar (principal of the institute). Roshan became an accomplished sarod player under the guidance of Allauddin Khan, the renowned sarod player from Maihar. In 1940, Khawaja Khurshid Anwar, programme producer/music, All India Radio Delhi, hired Roshan as staff artist for esraj, the instrument he used to play. He gave up this job in 1948 to seek fame and fortune in Bombay.

Career
In 1948, Roshan came to Bombay to find work as a Hindi film music director and became assistant of music composer Khawaja Khurshid Anwar in film Singaar (1949). He somewhat struggled until he met the then famous producer-director Kidar Sharma, who gave him the job of composing for his film Neki aur Badi (1949). While it was a flop, Kidar Sharma gave him another chance in his next film. Roshan emerged as a player on the Hindi film music scene with Baawre Nain (1950) which became a big musical hit.

In the early 1950s, Roshan worked with singers Mohammad Rafi, Mukesh and Talat Mahmood. Malhar (1951), Shisham, and Anhonee (1952 film) were some of the movies that he scored during the 1950s. During this time, he also composed the Meera bhajan which became a run-away hit, "Aeiri main to prem diwani mera dard na jane koyi" sung by Lata Mangeshkar for the movie Naubahar (1952).

He was not always commercially successful. He gave Indeewar and Anand Bakshi their first breaks in the Indian film industry as lyricists. Later, they became two of the most sought-after songwriters in Mumbai from the late 1960s onwards.

Anand Bakshi was given his first break in 1956 by the music director Nisar Bazmi in his film Bhala Aadmi (1956). Roshan gave Bakshi the film CID Girl (1959), after Anand Bakshi wrote the four songs of Bhala Aadmi in 1956. Bhala Aadmi was released in 1958 after some delay. Together, Anand Bakshi and Roshan made a super hit musical film Devar (1966).

The 1960s proved to be the golden age for Roshan and his music. His ability to mould folk music with Hindustani classical music became his trademark and resulted in successful movie musicals. During this time, Roshan gave hits such as "Na to karavan ki talaash hai from Barsat Ki Raat" and "Zindagi bhar nahi bhoolegi woh barsaat ki raat" (Barsaat Ki Raat, 1960). Barsaat Ki Raat also was a "super hit" film of 1960s.

"Ab kya misaal doon" and "Kabhi to milegi, kahi to milegi" (Aarti, 1962), "Jo vada kiya vo nibhana padega", "Paao chhoon lene do", "Jo baat tujhmein hai" and "Jurm-e-ulfat pe" (Taj Mahal, 1963), "Nigahen milane ko jee chahata hai" and "Laaga chunari mein daag" (Dil Hi To Hai, 1963), "Sansaar se bhaage phirte ho" and "Man re tu kaahe" (Chitralekha, 1964), and "Oh re taal mile" and "Khushi khushi kar do vida" (Anokhi Raat, 1968). He composed some melodies for the movie Mamta (1966) with lyrics by Majrooh Sultanpuri, "Rehte the kabhi jinke dil mein" and "Rahen Na Rahen Hum" sung by Lata Mangeshkar and her hit duet, "Chuppa Lo Yun Dil Mein Pyar Mera" with Hemant Kumar. Devar (1966): "Aaya hai mujhe phir yaad woh zalim, guzara zamana bachpan ka"; "Baharon ne mera chaman loot kar"; "Duniya mein aisa kahan sab ka naseeb hai".

Filmography and popular songs

Popular film qawwalis
 Naa Tau Kaarvan Ki Talaash Hai film Barsaat Ki Raat (1960)
 Yeh Hai Ishq Ishq film Barsaat Ki Raat (1960)
 Nigahein Milane Ko Jee Chahta Hai film Dil Hi To Hai (1963 film)

Roshan's marked speciality was the film qawwali. He was widely hailed for their composition.

Death and legacy 
Roshan had been suffering from chronic heart trouble for over 20 years. He died of a heart attack in Mumbai, Maharashtra, India, on 16 November 1967, age 50, leaving behind three sons and a daughter. He had a sudden heart attack while attending a social gathering.

Awards
 Filmfare Best Music Director Award for film Taj Mahal (1963)

References

External links
 

1917 births
1967 deaths
Filmfare Awards winners
Punjabi people
Hindi film score composers
20th-century composers
20th-century Indian musicians
People from Gujranwala